Happy Valley is an unincorporated community 11 miles (18 km) southwest of Redding, California. It lies at an elevation of roughly 850 feet. Its population is 4,949 as of the 2020 census. It is roughly divided into Cloverdale and Olinda across Happy Valley Road at Palm Rd. The United States Postal Service delivers mail to the residents of Happy Valley from nearby city Anderson, California. Happy Valley has a volunteer fire department.

References

Unincorporated communities in California
Unincorporated communities in Shasta County, California